Hoppner may refer to:

People
 Henry Parkyns Hoppner (1795–1833), officer of the Royal Navy, Arctic explorer, and draughtsman/artist
 John Hoppner (1758–1810), English portrait-painter; father of Henry Parkyns Hoppner
 Reinhard Höppner (1948–2014), German politician
 Jason Hoppner
 Trent Hoppner (born 1979), Australian rules footballer

Places
 Cape Hoppner, Northwest Territories, Canada
 Hoppner Inlet, Nunavut, Canada
 Hoppner Island, Ontario, Canada
 Hoppner River, Nunavut, Canada
 Hoppner Strait, Nunavut, Canada

See also
 Hoeppner